Ecofeminist art emerged in the 1970s in response to ecofeminist philosophy, that was particularly articulated by writers such as Carolyn Merchant, Val Plumwood, Donna Haraway, Starhawk, Greta Gaard, Karen J. Warren, and Rebecca Solnit. Those writers emphasized the significance of relationships of cultural dominance and ethics (Merchant, Plumwood, Donna Haraway) expressed as sexism (Haraway), spirituality (Starhawk), speciesism (Warren, Gaard), capitalist values that privilege objectification and the importance of vegetarianism in these contexts (Gaard). The main issues Ecofeminism aims to address revolve around the effects of a "Eurocentric capitalist patriarchal culture built on the domination of nature, and the domination of woman 'as nature'. The writer Luke Martell in the Ecology and Society journal writes that 'women' and 'nature' are both victims of patriarchal abuse and "ideological products of the Enlightenment culture of control." Ecofeminism argues that we must become a part of nature, living with and among it. We must recognize that nature is alive and breathing and work against the passivity surrounding it that is synonymous with the passive roles enforced upon women by patriarchal culture, politics, and capitalism.

The relevance of Ecofeminism was discussed in feminist art programs at the college and university level, including at the Institute for Social Ecology at Goddard College, Vermont. In the United States, as far back as 1962, an overwhelming series of lawsuits against the corporate world came from the kitchens of mothers and grandmothers. In 1964, Brazilian women set up the Acào Democràtica Feminina Gaucha which soon evolved into an advocacy group for sustainable agriculture. Women around the world were coming together in an effort to break the "continuum of Eurocentric patriarchal capitalist exploitation of natural resources, women, and of indigenous peoples."

Overview
The work of ecofeminist writers helped inspire many early male and female practitioners in the ecological art movement to imitate their concerns about a more horizontal relationship to environmental functions in their own practices. The feminist art writer Lucy Lippard, writing for the Weather Report Show she curated, which included many ecological artists and some ecofeminist artists from the list below (2007 Boulder Museum of Contemporary Art), commented on how many of those artists were women.

Authors who have written about ecofeminist artists most prominently include Gloria Feman Orenstein.

The Women's Environmental Art Directory (WEAD) is a compendium of women who self-identify as environmental artists, initiated by Jo Hanson and Susan Leibovitz Steinman in the 1990s, to credit women artists who might not otherwise be recognized by the mainstream art world. In addition to artists, some curators were influenced by ecofeminist thinking, such as Amy Lipton, co-curator of ecoartspace with Tricia Watts. Lipton initiated two relevant shows in her Soho gallery; Shapeshifters (1992) which included 22 women artists to commemorate the women who were tried and killed for witchcraft in Salem and The Abortion Project, a pro-choice art exhibition.

List of prominent ecofeminist artists

See also
Ecovention
Environmental art

References

Further reading
Progressions in Ecofeminist Art: The Changing Focus of Women in Environmental Art. Jade Wildy.

Contemporary art
 
Ecofeminist
Feminism-related lists